The Return of Sherlock Holmes is a 1905 collection of 13 Sherlock Holmes stories by Arthur Conan Doyle.

The Return of Sherlock Holmes may also refer to:

The Return of Sherlock Holmes (1929 film)
The Return of Sherlock Holmes (1987 film)
1994 Baker Street: Sherlock Holmes Returns, a 1993 American television movie
The Return of Sherlock Holmes (play), 1923
The second season of the television series Sherlock Holmes
The 1993 season of the BBC radio series Sherlock Holmes

See also
 Sherlock Holmes Returns, 1993 telefilm